The shepherd's leap is a folk sport practised throughout the Canary Islands.

History 
The origins of salto del pastor may date back to the Guanches, the aboriginal inhabitants of the islands prior to the Castilian conquest period of the early 15th century.  Canarian shepherds required a specialised means of transporting themselves safely across ravines and down steep embankments, and settled on the use of long wooden poles known as lanza or garrote.  These poles are fitted with sharp metal points called regatón.

Description 
Salto del pastor practitioners have developed a wide range of techniques to facilitate quick and agile movement across extremely difficult and dangerous terrain. These techniques range from pole-vaulting across crevices to the "dead drop" in which the practitioner leaps into space from heights of up to eight metres, jamming their garrote into the ground below and then sliding down the pole. There are many other types of leaps, depending on the nature of the obstacle that needs to be cleared.  Some of these are so fraught with risk that they have given rise to beautiful legends, such as the salto del enamorado (lover's leap) and the salto de media luna (half moon leap).

Development 
As salto del pastor has now developed into a folk-sport, the garrote is also used in competitive events, which include climbing up and jumping over walls, speedy descents down steep rocks, precision leaps, acrobatic feats and leaps of various.

Other data 
The lance of the shepherd is part of the iconographic attributes of Saint Peter of Saint Joseph de Betancur, who is the first saint of the Canary Islands. This is because said Saint was a pastor or peasant before becoming a missionary in Guatemala.

See also
 Fierljeppen
 Pole vault

References

External links  
 Web oficial de la Federación de Salto del Pastor Canario
 Patronato de Turismo, Salto del Pastor Canario
 Curso de Salto del Pastor Canario
 Web del Gobierno de Canarias sobre juegos y deportes tradicionales
 Detalles de construcción de garrotes

Canarian culture
Sport in the Canary Islands
Individual sports